Chris Demetriou born in Paphos, Cyprus, is a songwriter, musician, and record producer. A cover of a song he co-wrote with John Kongos, He's Gonna Step On You Again (which later became Step On by the alternative dance band Happy Mondays), appears in Q Magazine's top hundred singles of all time.

Music career 
Demetriou began his professional music career in his teens, playing keyboards for the Johannesburg R&B group, John E Sharpe & the Squires. He appeared on the group's most successful singles, including covers of The Kinks' Stop Your Sobbing and Paul Simon's I Am A Rock, as well as their Maybelline album.

Demetriou left South Africa for London with fellow musician John Kongos and the pair formed the psychedelic rock group Floribunda Rose.  However, the band soon changed its name to Scrugg and recorded a number of singles on the Pye label, with producer John Schroder and new drummer, Henry Spinetti. Scrugg enjoyed limited success, with their double A-side One Way Street and Linda Loves Linda receiving significant airplay but failing to perform well in the charts. The songwriting partnership of Kongos/Demetriou proved to be more successful than the groups they were in – with two songs reaching the top five in the UK charts and another, sung by Bond girl Daliah Lavi, reaching number one in Germany and Switzerland. Some of their early work, including recordings by Floribunda Rose and Scrugg, were released on the compilation Lavender Popcorn in 2001. They also wrote the music for the British cult film A Promise of Bed directed by Derek Ford and starring John Bird, Victor Spinetti and Dennis Waterman.

Demetriou's most notable songwriting credit is for He's Gonna Step on You Again, along with John Kongos. The original version was released by Kongos and made it into the UK Singles Chart for 14 weeks – reaching No. 4 in May 1971. The song was notably covered by the Happy Mondays (retitled as Step On) and this version was listed at number 77 in "The Top 100 Greatest Singles of All Time", published in the February 1999 edition of Q magazine. Demetriou again collaborated with Kongos on his follow-up single, Great White Lady but it did not enter the UK top twenty chart.

In 1970 Demetriou started to work with Tony Defries at Gem Productions and then with MainMan on David Bowie's material. 

Demetriou changed direction in 1972 and became a full-time record producer. One of his first recordings was a single with the group Milkwood. After quitting the New Seekers, Laurie Heath, Chris Barrington and Sally Graham formed Milkwood and they released three singles for Warner Bros., two of which Demetriou produced. Barry Krost signed the young record producer to BKN Management and Demetriou started working with Mike d'Abo, formerly of Manfred Mann, producing Down at Rachael's Place and Little MissUnderstood. As a result of being signed to the same management company, Demetriou collaborated with Cat Stevens in the recording of the album Buddha and the Chocolate Box. During these early years, Demetriou produced ten albums and over a dozen singles, including five albums for A&M Records (see Discography).

By the mid-1970s Demetriou had become an A&R manager / record producer for Decca Records, during which time he signed and recorded Robert Campbell, whose album Living in the Shadow was put forward by Decca for a Grammy nomination. 
Between the years 1984 and 1988, ACTS International (his South African record label, distributed by MFP), released three top five singles and one top twenty album—all of which were produced by Demetriou. In 2015 Demetriou ventured back into the music business and started a new record label Red Letter Music.

Discography
Production credits
 The Lady Wants More / Hayden Wood (7" Single) NEMS 1969
 House Beside the Mine/ Hayden Wood (7" Single) NEMS 1969
 Down At Rachel's Place / Mike d'Abo (12" LP) A&M Records 1972
 About Your Love / Milkwood (7" Single) Warner Bros 1972
 I'm a Song (Sing Me) / Milkwood (7" Single) Warner Bros June 1972
 Lookin' Through / Demick & Armstrong (12" LP) A&M Records 1972
 Travis / Travis (12" LP) A&M Records 1972
 Shine On Me / Paul Travis (12" LP) A&M Records 1973
 Buddha and the Chocolate Box / Cat Stevens (12" LP) Island Records 1974
 Return Of The Native / Paul Travis (12" LP) A&M Records 1975
 Higher Than Heaven / Buggati & Musker (Demo) Decca 1976
 Living In The Shadow / Robert Campbell (12" LP) Decca Records 1977
 Crawler / Crawler / (12" LP) CBS 1977
 Straight From The Hip / Liar (12"LP) Decca Records 1977
 Looking Kinda Rock & Roll / Darling (7" Single) Charisma 1978
 Ain't No Water / Linday Hayes (7" Single) Charisma 1978
 I'll Be Your Rock & Roll Slave / Lynda Hayes (7" Single) 1978
 Fast at Seventeen / Lee Fardon (7" Single) Arista 1978
 Come Holy Spirit / Vinesong (12" LP) WEA 1984
 Champions of Love / Tom Inglis (7" Single) ACTS 1985
 Destined to Win / Tom Inglis (7" Single) ACTS 1985
 What Have We Done To The World (7" Single) ACTS 1985
 Jubillee Africa / Friends First (12" LP) 1986
 Wild World / Pierre de Charmoy (7" Single) EMI 1987

Artist credits
 Maybelline, John E Sharpe & the Squires (12" LP) RPM 1965
 Stop Your Sobbing, John E Sharpe & the Squires (7" Single)
 I Am A Rock, John E Sharpe & the Squires (7" Single) RPM Records 1965
 I'll Explain / Yours For The Picking / Monkey Shine, Savage Sounds of Africa, Beat Records 1965
 One Way Street/ Linda Loves Linda – Floribunda Rose (7" Single) Pye Records 1967
 Lavender Popcorn, Scrugg (7" Single) Pye Records 1968
 Everyone Can See, Scrugg (7" Single) Pye Records 1968
 I Wish I Was Five, Scrugg (7" Single)  Pye Records 1969

Songwriting credits
 The House Beside The Mine / Hayden Wood (7" Single) NEMS 1969
 Deserts Of Mountains Of Men (LP) Confusions About A Goldfish / John Kongos / Dawn Records 1969
 Seat By The Window (LP) Confusions About A Goldfish / John Kongos / Dawn Records 1969
 Coming Back To You (LP) Confusions About A Goldfish / John Kongos / Dawn Records 1969
 He's Gonna Step On You Again with John Kongos (12" Single) Fly Records 1971;
 Gold / Olivia Newton-John (LP track) EMI 1972;
 Inside Your Shadow / Espanola (Comp) Essex 1972;
 Let The Love Grow (In Your Heart), Daliah Lavi (Single) Polydor 1973;
 Blaze of Glory / He's Gonna Step on You Again Exploding White Mice (7", Single B-side only) Greasy Pop Records 1987
 He's Gonna Step on You Again, Chantoozies (Single and Album) Mushroom Records 1989
 Pills 'N Thrills And Bellyaches (LP) Step On, London Records 1990
 Lavender Popcorn, with Floribunda Rose & Scrugg (Comp CD) 2001
 Kongos / John Kongos (Comp CD) Collectors' Choice Music 2001
 (He's Gonna) Step on You (Have A Little Faith – CD/Album) John Swan, Liberation Music 2007

References

 Roberts, David (2006). British Hit Singles & Albums, 19th, London: Guinness World Records Limited, p. 306. .
 Berry, Mark "Bez" (1998). Freaky Dancin', 1st, London: Pan, p. 285. .
 
 https://www.garagehangover.com/floribundarose/
 http://swisscharts.com/showperson.asp?name=Christos+Demetriou

Living people
Year of birth missing (living people)
British songwriters
British record producers
People from Paphos